36 Seasons is the eleventh studio album by American rapper and Wu-Tang Clan member, Ghostface Killah. It was released on December 9, 2014, by Tommy Boy Records.

Background
In a December 2014, interview with HipHopDX, Ghostface Killah said it took about 11 days to record the album. Like Ghostface Killah's previous album, Twelve Reasons to Die, 36 Seasons is a concept album. The album follows the story of Tony Starks as he returns to Staten Island after nine years away seeking a quiet life but he finds this will be difficult to accomplish.

Release and promotion
Record store Get On Down was the only retailer to sell 36 Seasons in vinyl format. Get On Down also sold a CD bundle that featured the vinyl version, an instrumental CD, poster, graphic novel booklet, and a T-shirt.

Critical reception

36 Seasons received generally positive reviews from music critics. At Metacritic, which assigns a normalized rating out of 100 to reviews from critics, the album received an average score of 72, which indicates "generally favorable reviews", based on 18 reviews. David Jeffries of AllMusic said, "Inspiration flows out of the man throughout the album, and this end-to-end concept is executed with little note-spinning or boring lyrics that just serve the story, and while Twelve Reasons took a big giallo risk and nailed it, this more expected, '70s-favored success still surprises with its vigorous sense of purpose." Homer Johnsen of HipHopDX stated, "36 Seasons may not be Ghostface’s greatest project, but it is another notable addition to his extensive body of work. Rapping alongside Kool G Rap and AZ for the bulk of the album is certainly a treat, and the two have their own moments of glory. Production, on the other hand, simply does not hold on to the lyrical dynamism present between Ghost, Pharoahe Monch, AZ and G." Michael Madden of Consequence of Sound said, "36 Seasons is the result of consummate artistic process and taste--a complete album both lyrically and musically."

Theon Weber of Spin said, "It's a small, controlled, uncommonly focused album, by an artist well into the kind of middle age that prizes refinement and brevity." Olivia Arezes of Exclaim! stated, "Ghost has always been considered a master of storytelling, and on 36 Seasons, he paints the usual sordid pictures in his songs, except this time he's cast an all-star team —Kool G Rap, AZ, Pharoahe Monch and others — as characters in an audio comic that's as action-packed as a kung-fu film." Matthew Fiander of PopMatters said, "His flow is solid on this album, and there’s no reason to suggest Ghostface is done, but if he is trying to recapture something, all we get here is sound and fury."

Track listing
Credits adapted from the album's liner notes.

Charts

References

2014 albums
Albums produced by the 45 King
Concept albums
Ghostface Killah albums
Tommy Boy Records albums